The Wild Angels is a 1966 American independent outlaw biker film produced and directed by Roger Corman. Made on location in Southern California, The Wild Angels was the first film to associate actor Peter Fonda with Harley-Davidson motorcycles and 1960s counterculture. It inspired the biker film genre that continued into the early 1970s.

The Wild Angels, released by American International Pictures (AIP), stars Fonda as the fictitious Hells Angels San Pedro, California chapter president "Heavenly Blues" (or "Blues"), Nancy Sinatra as his girlfriend "Mike", Bruce Dern as doomed fellow outlaw "the Loser", and Dern's then real-life wife Diane Ladd as the Loser's on-screen wife, "Gaysh".

Small supporting roles are played by Michael J. Pollard and Gayle Hunnicutt and, according to literature promoting the film, members of the Hells Angels from Venice, California. Members of the Coffin Cheaters motorcycle club also appeared.

In 1967 AIP followed this film with Devil's Angels, The Glory Stompers with Dennis Hopper, and The Born Losers.

Plot

Heavenly Blues is the leader of the Angels motorcycle gang from San Pedro, California. Loser (or "the Loser") is his best friend.  Mike is Blues' old lady.

The story begins in a quest to find Loser's stolen motorcycle. The plot is simply a buildup to a climax in the last half-hour of the film which is Loser's funeral. Loser's funeral is the showpiece of the film.

In between sprees of sex, drugs, rock and roll, booze, loud revving Harley chopper motorcycle engines, bongo drums and fights, the Angels ride out to Mecca, California in the desert to look for Loser's stolen motorcycle. One of the Angels finds a brake pedal, which he says is a piece of Loser's motorcycle, in a garage that is the hang-out of a Mexican group. The two groups brawl, with the Angels apparently winning. The police arrive and the Angels escape but Loser gets separated from the others and is left behind. He steals a police motorcycle but is not able to lose the policeman who is pursuing him or evade the roadblock that the police have in place. Eventually one of the officers shoots Loser in the back, putting him in the hospital.

Blues leads a small group of Angels to sneak Loser out of the hospital. A nurse hears a noise and comes into the hospital room. One of the Angels assaults her. Blues pulls the Angel away, forcing him to stop. The nurse, having seen Blues, identifies him to the police. The Angels take Loser to a biker bar and safe house run by 'Momma', a friend of the gang, but without proper medical care, Loser dies.

The Angels forge a death certificate for Loser and arrange for a church funeral in Sequoia Grove, Loser's rural hometown. Blues tells The Angels to go to Sequoia Grove on their bikes, in ones and twos, using different roads and do not show their club colors while traveling. The Angels arrive at Sequoia Grove, assemble at the church and carry in Loser's casket which is draped with a Nazi flag.

The funeral preacher arrives at the church; he looks at the assembled motorcycle gang and Loser, lying in repose in his coffin, with disdain. He undertakes a funeral sermon; it is a eulogy consisting entirely of funeral oratory cliches. This pathetic eulogy angers Blues and he interrupts the preacher's gibberish shouting, "Oh no, preach, not children of God, but Hell's Angels". Whereupon, the Angels decide to have a party in the church, with alcohol, dancing and reckless destruction of the church fixtures. They remove Loser from his coffin, they sit him up as a guest of honor and place a joint in his mouth. They beat and tie up the preacher and put him into the casket. Gaysh, the Loser's girlfriend, is drugged and raped by several members of the gang. Blues has sex with Momma, while Mike is kissed by another biker until Blues confronts them and slaps her. Blues then tells his gang that it is time to bury Loser.

The Angels, some riding their bikes, others walking and carrying Loser's casket, move through the town in a funeral procession to the Sequoia Grove Cemetery. At the cemetery, the people from the town show up outside the gate. A town youth throws a large rock, hitting one of the Angels, which provokes a brawl between the Angels and the townspeople. Police sirens are heard approaching in the background. Everyone scatters. The Angels mount their bikes and rapidly leave. Blues' girlfriend, Mike, begs him to leave. She tells Blues that his reaction to Loser's death is "like you went with him." But Blues refuses to leave and tells her to get on the bike of another member of the gang and go. With resignation, Blues says to Mike, "There's nowhere to go." Blues, left alone in the graveyard, puts on a pair of gloves and takes a shovel in hand. He slowly begins shoveling dirt into the open grave to bury his friend Loser.

Cast
 Peter Fonda as "Heavenly Blues"
 Nancy Sinatra as "Mike"
 Bruce Dern as Joe "Loser" Kearns
 Diane Ladd as "Gaysh"
 Buck Taylor as "Dear John"
 Norman Alden as Medic
 Michael J. Pollard as "Pigmy"
 Joan Shawlee as Momma Monahan
 Frank Maxwell as Preacher
 Gayle Hunnicutt as Suzie
 Dick Miller as Rigger
 Marc Cavell as "Frankenstein"

Production

Writing

Roger Corman became interested in making a film about the Hells Angels after seeing a photo of a biker funeral in the January 1966 issue of Life magazine . Corman approached AIP, Charles B. Griffith was hired to write a screenplay. Griffith's first draft was a near-silent movie which contrasted the bikers with the story of a police motorcycle cop. Corman did not like it and had Griffith rewrite it. Corman still was not happy and gave it to Peter Bogdanovich to rewrite. Bogdanovich had met Corman socially and agreed to write an adventure script in the vein of Lawrence of Arabia or Bridge on the River Kwai "only cheap"; Corman pulled Bogdanovich off that project and paid him $300 to work on Wild Angels. Bogdanovich later estimated he rewrote 80% of the script. He later directed second unit and did various other odd jobs. Corman claims the entire script was based on stories the Hells Angels recounted to them, "even though I think they embellished some of their stories."

To research the movie, Corman sponsored parties for the Hells Angels and attended the parties along with Griffith to take notes, according to Corman: “We went through a whole series of Hells Angels parties. We would buy them marijuana and beer — their essentials. They didn’t take any drugs other than marijuana then, and they didn’t seem to drink whiskey. Beer and marijuana was their trip. And they would tell us these stories of sexual action, fights, raids with other gangs."

Casting
George Chakiris and Peter Fonda were originally cast in the lead roles. However Chakiris could not ride a motorcycle so he was replaced by Fonda; with Bruce Dern taking Fonda's original role.

Nancy Sinatra, who was cast as "Mike", recalled:
When I was doing Wild Angels, Peter Fonda was talking about LSD and said, "Come on, Nancy, you should try it, it's great - I just woke up on the shelf of the linen closet." And I said, "What? Are you crazy? No thanks." I was the square peg in the round hole, I guess.

Release
Corman took chances with this subject matter and the Charles B. Griffith–authored screenplay, without being overly graphic, paid dividends commercially: The Wild Angels earned $7 million in theatrical rentals in the United States and Canada, the highest-grossing low-budget film at the time.

The film had admissions in France of 531,240 people.

The movie's success established Fonda as "a counter culture film star". During the films run in theaters Fonda was charged with possession of marijuana, and later recalled:
Simultaneously, I was in the front pages of newspapers being arrested for possession. It was a very strange chain of events. Roger put me on the screen as a cult hero. AIP then marketed posters of me worldwide showing me on my cycle taking a toke. And the Los Angeles police put me in the headlines, causing all the disenfranchised youth of the country, who were all popping their zits at that time, to notice me.

Reception and legacy 
Motion Picture Exhibitor wrote, "Much of what goes on here is revolting and repulsive, and ordinary filmgoers will probably react along those lines. On the other hand, there may be some teenagers who will clasp this release to their restive bosoms and proclaim this as their "in" or "protest" symbol. For them, it may become the film to see. The reaction could be quite raucous... Word-of-mouth it will certainly engender, but whether good or bad depends upon the outlook and the taste of individuals attending.

Bosley Crowther of The New York Times wrote, "This is the brutal little picture about a California motorcycle gang and its violent depredations... It is an embarrassment all right—a vicious account of the boozing, fighting, "pot"-smoking, vandalizing and raping done by a gang of "sickle riders" who are obviously drawn to represent the swastika-wearing Hell's Angels, one of several disreputable gangs on the West Coast. And despite an implausible ending and some rather amateurish acting by Peter Fonda and Nancy Sinatra in the leading roles, it gives a pretty good picture of what these militant motorcycle-cult gangs are."

Film critic Leonard Maltin called The Wild Angels "OK after about 24 beers."  It opened the Venice Film Festival in 1966, to tepid response. In a 2009 interview,  Corman told Mick Garris that the US State Department tried to prevent the film from being shown in Venice on the grounds that it "did not show America the way it is", but the film was shown there anyway.. The film holds a 63% "Fresh" rating on Rotten Tomatoes based on 19 reviews.

While promoting another of his 1960s counterculture movies, The Trip (1967), and autographing a movie still from The Wild Angels depicting Bruce Dern and him sharing one motorcycle, Fonda conceived the film Easy Rider.

Edited samples of dialogue from the film, from the scene where Fonda's character Blues explains his attitude toward life to the preacher at Loser's funeral, were used at the start of Mudhoney's 1989 track "In 'n' Out of Grace" (from Superfuzz Bigmuff), Primal Scream's 1990 single "Loaded" (from Screamadelica) and Eris Drew's 2021 track "Ride Free". Audio of Fonda's speech was also sampled repeatedly in the Edgar Wright film The World's End (2013), as well as repeated by Simon Pegg's character Gary King at the end of the movie. An excerpt of the audio was also featured in the launch trailer for the video game Need for Speed (2015).

Home media
The Wild Angels was released to DVD by MGM Home Video on April 1, 2003 as a Region 1 widescreen DVD as a double feature with Hell's Belles, on September 11, 2007 as part of The Roger Corman Collection (movie number seven of a set of eight), and to Blu-ray by Olive Films (under license from MGM) on February 17, 2015.

See also
 List of American films of 1966
 List of biker films
 Exploitation film
 Outlaw biker film

References

Further reading 
 Fonda, Peter, Don't Tell Dad, Hyperion Books (April 1998).
 Playboy, "Playboy Interview: Peter Fonda", HMH Publishing Co., Inc., pp. 85–108, 278–79 (September 1970).
 Look, "Nancy-Another Swinging Sinatra", Cowles Communications, Inc., pp. 59–63 (July 12, 1966).

External links 
 
 
 
 
Roger Corman on The Wild Angels at Trailers from Hell
 

1966 films
American International Pictures films
1960s English-language films
Outlaw biker films
Films directed by Roger Corman
Films shot in California
Films produced by Roger Corman
Films with screenplays by Charles B. Griffith
American action thriller films
1960s action thriller films
American exploitation films
1960s American films
1966 independent films
American independent films